Corey Lamont Holcomb (born June 23, 1969)  is an American comedian, radio host and actor. Born and raised in Chicago, Illinois, Holcomb got his start in comedy with the help of another Chicago-area comedian, Godfrey. He currently hosts his own internet show, The Corey Holcomb 5150 Show, which currently airs Tuesday nights (8PM-PST/11PM-EST), live on YouTube.  He resides in Los Angeles, CA.

Biography

Corey Holcomb was raised in Chicago's notorious (now defunct) Robert Taylor Homes. Following a short college basketball career, Holcomb began a career as a standup comedian in Chicago. Holcomb, along with comedians Godfrey and DeRay Davis, emerged as the face of Chicago's comedy scene in the late 1990s.

Career

Often billing himself as the "Ghetto Dr. Phil", most of Holcomb's standup material revolves around relationships, particularly relationships gone wrong. In addition to touring the country, he has been a regular on the stand-up/improv-based television shows Comic View, Def Comedy Jam, Last Comic Standing, and Nick Cannon Presents Wild 'n Out. Early in his career, Holcomb appeared once on The Jerry Springer Show with fellow comedian DeRay Davis. He has appeared in three comedy specials of his own, Corey Holcomb: The Problem Is You, Comedy Central Presents: Corey Holcomb, and Corey Holcomb: Your Way Ain't Working. He also appeared on the 2010 edition of Shaquille O'Neal's All-Star Comedy Jam.

As an actor, Holcomb has appeared as guest star on several sitcoms such as Half & Half, Everybody Hates Chris, Tyler Perry's House of Payne and Black Jesus, as well as minor roles in films such as Like Mike and Dance Flick. Holcomb is a recurring voice actor for the Family Guy spin-off The Cleveland Show, for which he provides the voice of Robert Tubbs, Cleveland's rival and the ex-husband of his wife Donna. Holcomb was a regular personality on Jamie Foxx's satellite radio channel The Foxxhole from 2007 to 2011. He currently hosts his own internet show, The Corey Holcomb 5150 Show, which currently airs Tuesday nights (8PM-PST/11PM-EST), live on YouTube.

The Corey Holcomb 5150 Show often focuses on issues within the African-American community. Topics such as single mothers, police brutality, racism, and black economic development are often topics of conversation.

Holcomb has been vocally critical of former U.S. President Barack Obama, calling him a "fraud and fake messiah for black people." 

Holcomb is close friends with comedian Kevin Hart. Holcomb credits Hart, along with film producer Will Packer, with helping him earn roles in major motion pictures.

Filmography

Films

Television

Comedy Special

References

External links

 
Corey Holcomb on YouTube
5150 Show

Living people
African-American male comedians
American male comedians
African-American male actors
Male actors from Chicago
African-American radio personalities
Comedians from Illinois
21st-century American comedians
1969 births
21st-century African-American people
20th-century African-American people